Salvatore "Turtle" Assante is a fictional character on the comedy-drama television series Entourage. He is played by Jerry Ferrara.

Fictional biography
Turtle is a childhood friend of Vincent Chase (Adrian Grenier) from Queens. He is the only one of the main characters who is not directly involved with the acting business.

Turtle is Vincent's driver and takes care of issues around the house.  He brings street smarts and an urban flavour to the group and is a frequent user of marijuana and a supplier to the rest of the group.

Turtle often finds the good in all bad situations and brings relative calm to the group. Turtle's importance is at times overlooked, but his insight and personal connections sometimes solve difficult issues.

Turtle loves sneakers, especially rare Air Force 1s. He is mainly seen wearing jerseys of New York athletes such as Allan Houston and Alex Rodriguez, and a baseball cap, usually the New York Yankees.

Despite his parasitic relationship with Vince, his loyalty and friendship temper his baser qualities. Turtle has a Rottweiler named Arnold.

In Episode #2.11 "Blue Balls Lagoon", it is revealed that Turtle is Sicilian-American.

It is also revealed that it was because of Turtle that Vincent got to L.A.:  Turtle used to be a bookie while in high school, and he paid for everyone's tickets to L.A., and for food when they arrived.

Turtle's working status and questionable looks prevent him from being more appealing to women, until he starts dating Jamie-Lynn Sigler. 

He shares with Jamie-Lynn his desire to open up a restaurant one day. Turtle begins to attend college in Season 6.

Turtle's newfound appeal to women and Jamie's decision to star in a New Zealand-shot TV series force the two to end their relationship. Turtle tries to get over Jamie by getting together with Brooke Manning, a UCLA coed who has a crush on him. He finds himself unable to make love with Brooke, realizing that he truly loves Jamie, and he decides to see her in New Zealand. Jamie calls him to tell him not to come because she doesn't want a long-distance relationship with someone she loves after a prior heartbreak.

Turtle later promotes a tequila brand called Avión with his girlfriend Alex.  He gets into some trouble with the tequila supplier, Carlos, and businessman Mark Cuban. While on tour promoting the tequila, Alex meets a new man, effectively ending her relationship with Turtle. This leaves Turtle uncertain as to his future in the tequila venture. Vince steps in to help Turtle as he tries to help a New York friend expand his restaurant business to the west coast. Turtle reveals that he sold all his stock in Avión, and when the company goes public, he laments that he has missed out on making a fortune.  Vince reveals that not only did Vince not sell his own stock, but he also bought Turtle's shares to prevent him from making such a mistake. Turtle thus becomes a millionaire.

Turtle's last scene in the series is him boarding the private jet to Paris with the rest of the gang. Turtle returns in the movie and takes an interest in female MMA fighter Ronda Rousey, who agrees to go out with him if he lasts 30 seconds in a bout with her.

Interests
Turtle loves expensive cars, persuading Vince to lease a 2004 Rolls-Royce Phantom in Season 1, and driving throughout the rest of the series a yellow 2003 Hummer H2 that was given to Dom as a severance package in Season 3. Turtle's main choice of transportation were luxury SUVs in the series, including a 2002 Cadillac Escalade in the pilot episode, and a 2004, 2006, 2007, and 2008 Cadillac Escalade ESVs.

In Season 6, for his 30th birthday, Vince gives Turtle a 2009 Ferrari California, and his girlfriend Jamie-Lynn Sigler buys him a 2009 Porsche 911 convertible, complete with "Turtle" personalized license plates. In Season 6, the 2008 Cadillac Escalade ESV is replaced with a 2009 Cadillac Escalade Hybrid. In Season 7, the Escalade Hybrid is replaced with a 2010 Cadillac Escalade Platinum. In the final season, a 2011 Cadillac Escalade ESV is the main choice of transportation for Turtle.

Character name
Throughout the first five seasons, the audience is told his name only once.  In Episode 11 of Season 5, he tells actress Jamie-Lynn Sigler, with whom he is starting a relationship, that his name is Sal. Also, in episode 2 of season 6 he tells an interviewer that he let Jamie call him Sal but she's the only one allowed. One last time in the season 8 finale he tells E and Sloan that if their baby is a boy, they should name it Sal. Though the last name "Vacara" appeared on the TV quiz show Jeopardy!, which did not give a source, Ferrara says Sal's last name is Assante. This name was later used for the character in the film.

Ferrara said Entourage creator Doug Ellin granted his request that Turtle's real name be "Sal" in tribute to Sal Assante, a friend who died in 2002.

Inspiration
The Turtle character was based on Mark Wahlberg's real-life assistant, Donnie "Donkey" Carroll, who died on December 18, 2005 of an asthma attack, at age 39. At one point, Carroll and Wahlberg had a dispute because Carroll claimed Wahlberg never paid him for appropriating his life story for Entourage, while compensating others, but the two remained friends. During his 14 years working as Wahlberg's personal assistant, Carroll tried to launch a rap music career under the stage name Murda One.

References

External links 
 

Entourage (American TV series) characters
Fictional business executives
Fictional cannabis users
Fictional drivers
Fictional characters from Los Angeles
Fictional characters from New York City
Television characters introduced in 2004
American male characters in television
 Fictional Italian American people
Fictional Sicilian people